Friedhof is German for cemetery.  See:
 List of cemeteries in Germany
 List of cemeteries in Berlin
 Städtischer Friedhof III
 Weißensee Cemetery
 Zentralfriedhof Friedrichsfelde
 Friedhof Fluntern, Fluntern Cemetery, Zürich, Switzerland
 Friedhof von Ziegelskoppel, Kopli cemetery,  Kopli, Estonia

See also
 Hugo Friedhofer